Coming to Your Senses is the eighth studio album by guitarist Frank Gambale, released on 8 February 2000 through Favored Nations Entertainment.

Track listing

Personnel
Frank Gambale – guitar, electric sitar, sound effects, arrangement, production
Hans Zermuehlen– keyboard
Mark Schulman – drums (tracks 1, 6, 9)
Ray Brinker – drums (tracks 2, 8)
Joel Taylor – drums (tracks 3, 4, 7)
Enzo Todesco – drums (tracks 5, 10)
Ric Fierabracci – bass
Robert M. Biles – engineering
Joe Gastwirt – mastering

References

External links
In Review: Frank Gambale "Coming To Your Senses" at Guitar Nine Records

Frank Gambale albums
2000 albums
Favored Nations albums